Miss America's Outstanding Teen 2010 was the 5th Miss America's Outstanding Teen pageant held at the Linda Chapin Theatre in the Orange County Convention Center in Orlando, Florida on August 15, 2009. Taylor Hanna Fitch of South Carolina crowned her successor Jeanette Morelan of Wisconsin at the end of the event. This was the first time that Miss Wisconsin's Outstanding Teen captured the title of Miss America's Outstanding Teen. Miss America 2009 Katie Stam was an emcee for the pageant.

Results

Placements

Other awards

Contestants 
The Miss America's Outstanding Teen 2010 contestants were:

References 

2010
2010 in Florida
2010 beauty pageants